The Inn at Little Washington is a luxury country inn and restaurant located in Washington, Virginia.  Patrick O'Connell and Reinhardt Lynch founded the Inn in a former garage in 1978.  It has been a member of the Relais & Châteaux hotel group since 1987.

Awards and honors 
The Inn has been featured in several national and international newspapers including The Washington Post and The New York Times. It was the first establishment to ever receive five stars for both its accommodations and its cuisine in the Mobil Travel Guide, a distinction that it still maintains. It repeated this feat by becoming the first restaurant/inn to receive five diamonds from the AAA for both its food and accommodations in 1989.  The inn and restaurant have maintained that distinction through 2016. In 2018, the Inn received a coveted three-star rating from the Michelin Guide. The restaurant received five James Beard Foundation awards including those for Best Service, Best Wine List, Restaurant of the Year, Best Chef in the Mid–Atlantic and Chef of the Year. The International Herald Tribune rated it as one of the Top Ten Best Restaurants in the World. The Zagat Survey for Washington, D.C. rated it number one in all categories for 14 consecutive years. Travel & Leisure Magazine has ranked the Inn as the number one hotel in the world for food, number 8 in the world, and number 2 in North America overall. The restaurant has been awarded Wine Spectator's "Grand Award" for the last 12 years. Other distinctions include Cigar Aficionado's "Grand Cru" award for the restaurant's wine list, and the "Reader's Top Table" award in Gourmet's Restaurant Issue. 

Andrew Lloyd Webber once claimed, "For my money this little hotel provides the best overall dining experience I can remember in a long while, perhaps my best ever."

The Inn's history was detailed in a 2010 article, stating that the Inn's staff "discreetly tries to detect and record the emotional state of each person in a dinner party on a scale of 1 to 10. Their goal is to get you up to at least a "9" before the long drive home. This simple rating system allows the staff at The Inn to make very subtle adjustments to service throughout the night—so that even someone who arrives for dinner in a serious funk will likely wind up walking on country air before the night is through."

Ownership 
Though initially owned and operated by Patrick O'Connell and Reinhardt Lynch upon its 1978 opening, the Inn is no longer owned jointly by the former business and romantic partners. Their personal relationship deteriorated in 2006 and precipitated the business split. The Washington Post reported that O'Connell, the chef, took out a loan for $17.5 million in January 2007 in order to facilitate a buyout of Lynch and became sole owner of the establishment. The specific amount Lynch received was not disclosed.

See also
 List of Michelin 3-star restaurants
 List of Michelin 3-star restaurants in the United States

Notes

References

External links 

 

Restaurants in Virginia
Washington, Virginia
Buildings and structures in Rappahannock County, Virginia
Restaurants established in 1978
1978 establishments in Virginia
Tourist attractions in Rappahannock County, Virginia
American companies established in 1978
James Beard Foundation Award winners
Michelin Guide starred restaurants in the United States